This is a sub-article to Podlaskie Voivodeship
Throughout its early history, the area comprising the current day Podlaskie Voivodeship was inhabited by various tribes of different ethnic roots. In the 9th and 10th centuries, the area was likely inhabited by Lechitic tribes in the south, Baltic (Yotvingian) tribes in the north, and Ruthenian tribes in the east. Between the 10th and 13th centuries, the area was part of the Ruthenian principalities. The area became a part of the Medieval Slavic cities union of Cherven cities. Until the 14th century the area was part of pro-Kyivan Ruthenian states, and was later annexed by the Grand Duchy of Lithuania. In 1569, after the Union of Lublin, the western part of Podlaskie was ceded to the Kingdom of Poland.

Historical periods
The following is a partial list of political subdivisions in which part or all of current day Podlaskie Voivodeship was wholly or partially contained within:

Russian Empire
 Grodno Governorate (1842–1915)
 Belostok Oblast (1807–1842)
Kingdom of Poland (Congress Poland)
Kingdom of Prussia
 Białystok Department (1795–1807)

Polish-Lithuanian Commonwealth
 Podlaskie Voivodeship (1569–1795)

Grand Duchy of Lithuania
 Podlaskie Voivodeship (1513–1569)
 Trakai Voivodeship
 Duchy of Trakai
 Duchy of Lithuania
Kingdom of Poland
 Duchy of Masovia

Kingdom of Galicia–Volhynia
 Galicia–Volhynia  (Land of Berestia)
Kievan Rus
 Kievan Rus
 Yotvingia

History
In the second half of the 15th century, the Drohicka land was divided into three smaller administrative and territorial units: the Drohicka land, the Bielsko land and the Mielnica land. The formal creation of the Podlaskie Voivodeship took place on August 29 1513 when Ivan Sapieha, who held the office of governor and later the Vitebsk governor was appointed the Voivode of Podlasie even before he was formally called to live in that voivodeship. Ivan Sapieha died in 1517 and for three years the voivodship did not have a voivode. In 1519 to this office was appointed to Albertas Goštautas, who possessed extensive Tykocin estates and he was the Voivode of Trotsky.

In 1520, Sigismund I the Old, who was in Toruń, appointed Janusz Kostewicz for the position of the Podlaskie voivode. In 1566, the area of the Podlasie Voivodship was reduced by the Brest, Kamnica and Kobrin lands, which, together with the Turn-Pińsk principality, formed the Brest-Lithuanian Voivodship. Three years later, in 1569, the reduced Podlasie Province was incorporated into the Crown by the order of Sigismund II Augustus and the resolution of the Sejm of the Polish–Lithuanian Commonwealth. 

After the third partition of Poland in 1795, Białystok Region came under Prussian rule. In the occupied areas, the Prussians formed the Organization Camera of the War and Domain Camera, which was located in Bialystok. The area of operation of the Camera Organizational Committee in Bialystok included 4 compartments: Wierzbołowski, Pułtusk, Białystok and Łomża. Circuses were divided into smaller organizational units, i.e. districts. They were established in Białystok, Bielsko, Dąbrowa, Goniądz, Sokółka, Tykocin, Ciechanowiec, Drohiczyn, Ostrołęka, Wąsosz, Zambrów, Wiźno, Ciechanów, Maków, Nasielsk, Płońsk, Przasnysz, Wyszków, Hołynka, Kalwaria, Mariampach, Wampachki. The lowest level of the territorial division was made up of village clusters with head leaders, nobility clusters with caretakers and cities with mayors. The works of the Commission ended in 1797 and the Camera of War and Domains of the Białystok Department was created. The Bialystok Department embraced 10 landrat districts. Their headquarters were: Łomża, Goniądz, Drohiczyn, Suraż, Bielsk, Białystok, Dąbrowa, Wigry, Kalwaria, and Mariampol. 

Napoleon gave the poviats of Bialystok, Drohiczyn, Bielsko and Sokólski, with parts of the Suraski, Biebrza and Dąbrowa poviats to Aleksander I, on July 7, 1807, the Tsar of Tylyce, a year later the Russian authorities created a separate administrative unit from this territory - the Belostok Oblast, consisting of from four counties: Białystok, Bielsko, Sokólski and Drohiczyn.

References

Podlaskie Voivodeship
History of Poland